Paul Caruso (1920–2001) was a criminal defense attorney in Los Angeles, California. He served in the United States Marine Corps during World War II.

Legal career
Paul Caruso was admitted to practice law in August 1953 following graduation from the Columbus University School of Law in Washington DC (now the Columbus School of Law of the Catholic University of America). He obtained a veteran's waiver for admission to the California Bar.

Caruso later represented war hero and actor Audie Murphy on a charge of trying to kill a Burbank dog trainer who Murphy claimed brutalized the dog and made advances towards Murphy's girlfriend. Caruso has also represented Charles Manson follower Susan Atkins, Eddie Nash—who was accused of four Laurel Canyon slayings—and TV sports reporter Stan Duke, who was charged in the gunshot slaying of radio commentator Averill Berman.

Caruso was the founding president of the Italian American Lawyers Assn. in Los Angeles.

Caruso had five children, and his eldest son, Carey Caruso, still runs his father's practice.

External links
Ofgang, Kenneth Legendary Criminal Defense Lawyer Paul Caruso Dies at 81 Metropolitan News (August 16, 2001)
Grace, Roger Paul Caruso: ‘He Was a Helluva Guy’ Metropolitan News (August 21, 2001)
L.A. Times Obituary from Charles Manson web site.

Lawyers from Los Angeles
Criminal defense lawyers
Columbus School of Law alumni
1920 births
2001 deaths
20th-century American lawyers
United States Marine Corps personnel of World War II